A Brand Book records all livestock brands registered with an organization. In the U.S. most states have branding laws that require brands to be registered before use. This may be a state agency (usually affiliated with each state's Department of Agriculture) or a private association regulated by the state. Most states with such laws have a Brand Book for the entire state. Texas, an exception, registers brands at the county level. These book are usually provided free to law enforcement personnel and County Extension Agents. Some states have their Brand Books available online.

A typical Brand Book will usually have an image of the brand, the location of the brand on the animal, and the type of animal that will be branded, as well as the owner of the brand. Many Brand Books also record earmarks.

Brand Books are used by law enforcement officials, brand inspectors, and association investigators to record and track livestock movement, deter loss of livestock by straying or theft, and prosecute thieves.

External links

United States 
California Brand Book–online
Colorado Brand Book (ordering information)
Kansas Brand Book
Montana Brand Book (ordering information)
Nebraska Brand Book–online search
Nevada Brand Book–pdf download available
Oklahoma Brand Book
Texas and Southwestern Cattle Raisers Association
Wyoming Brand Book

Canada
Alberta Brand Book & online search
Saskatchewan Brand Book–online search

Reference works
Livestock
Culture of the Western United States
American cattlemen